Heðin Hansen (born 30 July 1993) is a Faroese footballer who plays as a midfielder for HB and the Faroe Islands national team.

Career
Hansen made his international debut for Faroe Islands on 7 October 2020 in a friendly match against Denmark, which finished as a 0–4 away loss.

Career statistics

International

References

External links
 
 
 Heðin Hansen at FaroeSoccer.com

1993 births
Living people
Faroese footballers
Faroe Islands youth international footballers
Faroe Islands under-21 international footballers
Faroe Islands international footballers
Association football midfielders
Víkingur Gøta players
Havnar Bóltfelag players
Faroe Islands Premier League players
1. deild players
2. deild players